A subvolcanic rock, also known as a hypabyssal rock, is an intrusive igneous rock that is emplaced at depths less than  within the crust, and has intermediate grain size and often porphyritic texture between that of volcanic rocks and plutonic rocks. Subvolcanic rocks include diabase (also known as dolerite) and porphyry. Common examples of subvolcanic rocks are diabase, quartz dolerite, microgranite, and diorite.

See also
 Cone sheet
 Dike (geology)
 Igneous intrusion
 Sill (geology)

References

Igneous petrology
Volcanology
 

he:סלע געשי#סלעים תת-געשיים